, is a 1955 Japanese film directed by Fumito Kurata. It was based on a best-seller by Momoko Ishii.

Cast

References

External links 
 

Japanese black-and-white films
1955 films
Japanese fantasy films
1950s fantasy films
1950s Japanese films